Fudbalski klub Sloboda Mrkonjić Grad (Serbian Cyrillic: Фудбалски клуб Cлoбoдa Mpкoњић Гpaд) is a football club from the town of Mrkonjić Grad, Republika Srpska, Bosnia and Herzegovina.

Club management

Coaching history

  Milorad Glamočak (2007–2008)
  Dragan Vukša (2008–2010)
  Darko Nestorović (2010–2011)
  Zoran Dragišić (2011 – 16 June 2014)
  Đorđe Inđić (13 July 2014 – 14 December 2014)
  Vule Trivunović (1 January 2015 – 30 June 2015) 
   Dragan Vukša (15 October 2015 – 21 May 2017) 
   Igor Mirković (29 June 2020 – 14 November 2021) 
   Darko Maletić (22 January 2022 – present)

Club presidents

  Draženko Vasić (2007–2009)
  Boro Rudić (2009–2013)
  Željko Stipanović (2013–?)
  Milenko Milekić 
  Borislav Šarić (2021–present)

Kit manufacturers and shirt sponsors

Honours

Domestic

National Championships

 First League of Republika Srpska:
 Runners-up: 2012–13
 Third Place: 2011–12
 Third Place: 2013–14

Cups
Republika Srpska Cup:
Runners-up: 2011/12

External sources
 FK Sloboda Mrkonjić Grad at FSRS
 FK Sloboda Mrkonjić Grad at RS-sport

References

 
Football clubs in Republika Srpska
1945 establishments in Bosnia and Herzegovina
Football clubs in Bosnia and Herzegovina